The 2001 Prix de l'Arc de Triomphe was a horse race held at Longchamp on Sunday 7 October 2001. It was the 80th running of the Prix de l'Arc de Triomphe.

The winner was Sakhee, a four-years-old colt trained in Great Britain by Saeed bin Suroor. The winning jockey was Frankie Dettori.

Race details
 Sponsor: Groupe Lucien Barrière
 Purse: 10,500,000 F; First prize: 6,000,000 F
 Going: Holding
 Distance: 2,400 metres
 Number of runners: 17
 Winner's time: 2m 36.1s

Full result

 Abbreviations: shd = short-head; nk = neck; dist = distance

Winner's details
Further details of the winner, Sakhee.
 Sex: Colt
 Foaled: 14 February 1997
 Country: United States
 Sire: Bahri; Dam: Thawakib (Sadler's Wells)
 Owner: Godolphin
 Breeder: Shadwell Farm

References

External links
 Colour Chart – Arc 2001

Prix de l'Arc de Triomphe
 2001
Prix de l'Arc de Triomphe
Prix de l'Arc de Triomphe
Prix de l'Arc de Triomphe